Vicki Ann Cremona is the Chair of the School of Performing Arts at the University of Malta, Professor in the Theatre Studies Department and a former Ambassador. She served as Ambassador to France (2005-2009), and to Tunisia between 2009 and 2013.

Publications
Some of the books Cremona co-edited and co-authored include Theatrical Events. Borders, Dynamics, Frames (2004), Playing Culture. Conventions and Extensions of Performance (2014). Conventions and Extensions of Performance (2014),On Culture. Mapping Valletta 2018 (2016), Spazji Teatrali, A Catalogue of Theatres in Malta and Gozo (2017).

References

Ambassadors of Malta to France
Academic staff of the University of Malta
Women ambassadors
Ambassadors of Malta to Tunisia
Year of birth missing (living people)
Living people
Women non-fiction writers